The Huning Highlands Conoco Service Station is a historic gas station in the Huning Highlands neighborhood of Albuquerque, New Mexico. It was built in 1937 by the Continental Oil Company (Conoco) and is notable as a well-preserved example of the automobile-oriented development that shaped the city during the mid-20th century. The building was listed on the New Mexico State Register of Cultural Properties and the National Register of Historic Places in 2006.

The service station is built in the form of a cottage, a popular design at the time, with a steeply pitched compound gable roof and a chimney. The walls are white glazed brick with green trim. The building has a side-gabled office section on the west side adjoining two front-gabled garage bays with wooden roll-up doors. The easternmost garage bay was an addition built onto the original station around 1939. The property also includes concrete gas pump islands, a c. 1960s light pole and a steel sign post, though the pumps, tanks, and signage have been removed. The station was operated by Conoco until 1961, then by Horn Oil Company until around 1983. In 1992, the vacant station was leased by the Albuquerque Conservation Association (TACA), which uses the building as headquarters for its preservation workshops and other activities.

See also 
 Continental Oil Company Building: NRHP-listed Conoco bulk storage complex in Cheyenne, Wyoming
 Continental Oil Company Filling Station: NRHP-listed Conoco gas station in Kalispell, Montana
 Jackson Conoco Service Station: NRHP-listed Conoco gas station in El Reno, Oklahoma
 Hughes Conoco Service Station: NRHP-listed Conoco gas station in Topeka, Kansas
 Rainbow Conoco: NRHP-listed Conoco gas station in Shelby, Montana
 Spraker Service Station: NRHP-listed Conoco gas station in Vinita, Oklahoma

References

Transportation buildings and structures on the National Register of Historic Places in New Mexico
National Register of Historic Places in Albuquerque, New Mexico
Commercial buildings in Albuquerque, New Mexico
Commercial buildings completed in 1937
New Mexico State Register of Cultural Properties
ConocoPhillips
Gas stations on the National Register of Historic Places in New Mexico